During the 2018–19 season, RC Celta de Vigo participated in La Liga and the Copa del Rey.

Players

Squad

Reserve team

Out on loan

Transfers

In

Out

Competitions

Overall

La Liga

League table

Results summary

Results by round

Matches

Copa del Rey

Round of 32

Statistics

Appearances and goals
Last updated on 18 May 2019.

|-
! colspan=14 style=background:#dcdcdc; text-align:center|Goalkeepers

|-
! colspan=14 style=background:#dcdcdc; text-align:center|Defenders

|-
! colspan=14 style=background:#dcdcdc; text-align:center|Midfielders

|-
! colspan=14 style=background:#dcdcdc; text-align:center|Forwards

|-
! colspan=14 style=background:#dcdcdc; text-align:center| Players who have made an appearance or had a squad number this season but have left the club
|-

|}

References

RC Celta de Vigo seasons
Celta Vigo